The 2020 East African Express Airways Brasilia crash was an aviation accident involving an East African Express Airways Embraer EMB 120 Brasilia that was on approach to Berdale on a chartered cargo flight from Baidoa Airport, Somalia on 4 May 2020 when it was allegedly shot down by ground troops of the Ethiopian National Defense Force. All 6 occupants, four non-revenue passengers and two crew, were killed. The  plane was carrying medical supplies to assist with the COVID-19 pandemic in Somalia, as well as mosquito nets. 

According to a one-page African Union peacekeeping force incident report that was leaked on Twitter on 10 May, Ethiopian troops not affiliated with the peacekeeping mission fired on the aircraft because it made a non-standard approach from the west instead of the east, and it exhibited an irregular flight path, leading the troops to conclude that it may be engaged in a suicide attack; the report cited a "lack of communication and awareness" by the Ethiopian troops. However, officials emphasized that the report contains readily apparent contradictions and factual errors, and Smaïl Chergui, the African Union Peace and Security Commissioner, said that the peacekeeping force lacks the expertise to conclusively determine the cause of the crash; a joint accident investigation by officials from Somalia, Ethiopia and Kenya is underway, with preliminary findings expected in 45 days. In addition to investigating the crash itself, Somali leaders questioned why Ethiopian troops outside the authority of the peacekeeping force were conducting armed operations in Somalia; there has been a history of controversial unauthorized incursions into Somalia by Ethiopian and Kenyan troops pursuing Al-Shabaab militants.

See also
 List of aircraft shootdowns

References

2020 in international relations
2020 in Somalia
Accidents and incidents involving the Embraer EMB 120 Brasilia
Airliner shootdown incidents
Aviation accidents and incidents in 2020
Aviation accidents and incidents in Somalia
Bay, Somalia
May 2020 events in Africa
Military operations involving Ethiopia
2020 disasters in Somalia